The Men's 10,000 metres at the 2008 Summer Olympics took place on August 17 at the Beijing National Stadium.

The race was dominated by the Ethiopian and Kenyan teams along with Tadese of Eritrea. With 200m remaining, Bekele pulled away from the rest of the field with a final lap of 53.42 seconds, winning his second 10,000m Olympic gold medal.

Competition format
The qualifying standards for the 2008 event were 27:50.00 (A standard) and 28:10.00 (B standard).

The Men's 10,000m competition consisted of only one race the Final.

Records
Prior to this competition, the existing world and Olympic records were as follows:

The following new Olympic record was set during this competition.

Results

OR - Olympic Record, NR - National Record, PB - Personal Best, SB - Season Best

Splits

References

Athletics at the 2008 Summer Olympics
10,000 metres at the Olympics
Men's events at the 2008 Summer Olympics